Rozalla Miller (born 18 March 1964), better known as simply Rozalla, is a Zimbabwean electronic music performer who was born in what was then Northern Rhodesia (now Zambia). At the age of 18, she moved with her parents to her father's country of origin, Zimbabwe. She is best known for her three 1991/92 hit singles "Faith (In the Power of Love)", "Are You Ready To Fly", and particularly "Everybody's Free (To Feel Good)", which has been remixed and re-issued several times. In December 2016, Billboard magazine ranked her as the 98th most successful dance artist of all-time.

Musical career
Rozalla began performing at a young age in her native Zambia singing in clubs and at events; then at age 13, she was singing on a children's TV show. Still in her teens, she relocated to Zimbabwe where she fronted various R&B cover bands before beginning her own recording career with a resultant five number-one hits on that nation's chart. In 1988, Rozalla relocated to London with her manager Chris Sergeant and worked with the Band of Gypsies, a production duo consisting of Nigel Swanston and Tim Cox.

Rozalla's first UK single "Born to Luv Ya" became a club hit in 1990. The singer's career really took off when the dance anthem "Everybody's Free (To Feel Good)", reached number 6 in the UK Singles Chart in 1991. It became a Top 10 hit in many European countries soon afterwards and reached the Billboard Top 40 the following year. It remains her biggest hit to date. It was later included on her debut album Everybody's Free, which peaked at number 20 in the UK Albums Chart and went silver. The album spawned two more sizeable hits in "Faith (In the Power of Love)" and "Are You Ready to Fly", reaching number 11 and 14 respectively in the UK Singles Chart, plus a lesser charting single in the ballad "Love Breakdown".

In 1992, Rozalla toured with Michael Jackson, opening all of his shows on the European leg of his Dangerous tour, including the UK. She enjoyed four UK Top 40 hits in 1994/95, including her rendition of "I Love Music", the theme song to the film Carlito's Way. The attendant album Look No Further featured more R&B and soul elements than her previous album.

A 1996 remix of "Everybody's Free" reached number 30 in the UK Singles Chart. Her 1998 album Coming Home saw her reunite with the Band of Gypsies and spawned a stateside club hit with its lead single "Don't Go Lose It Baby", produced by METRO.

In 2003, Rozalla entered the lower regions of the UK Singles Chart alongside Plastic Boy on the song "Live Another Life". She issued the jazz/soul album Brand New Version in 2009, adding her surname Miller to her recording guise. She promoted the album by performing as Billy Ocean's support act on his UK tour of 2009. A Global Deejays remix of "Everybody's Free" reached number 7 in Australia in 2009 after it had been used as the theme song to So You Think You Can Dance.

In 2015, Rozalla returned to the Top 10 of the Billboard Club Dance Charts for the first time since 1994 with her track "If You Say It Again". This was quickly followed by the single "Shadows of the Moon".

Discography

Studio albums
 1989: Spirit of Africa
 1992: Everybody's Free (UK No. 20, AUS No. 75, GER No. 53, NED No. 62, SUI No. 31, SWE No. 36)
 1995: Look No Further (UK No. 138)
 1998: Coming Home
 2009: Brand New Version

Compilation albums
 1993: Everybody's Free- Style 1993 - Remixed To Perfection
 1998: Feelin' Good'
 2003: Best Of 2004: Everybody's Free'' (Special Edition with DVD)

Singles

See also

List of number-one dance hits (United States)
List of artists who reached number one on the US Dance chart

References

1964 births
Living people
Alumni of Chinhoyi High School
British dance musicians
21st-century British women singers
British house musicians
Epic Records artists
People from Ndola
Zambian emigrants to the United Kingdom
Zambian people of Zimbabwean descent
Zimbabwean emigrants to the United Kingdom
20th-century Zimbabwean women singers